Academic Club London Football Club, commonly known as AC London, was a semi-professional football club based in London, England. The club was expelled from the Combined Counties Football League in November 2018 and folded.

History
The club was established by Prince Choudary as a youth team in July 2012 as a response to the 2011 London riots, before adding a full age team the following year, with Choudary becoming the youngest manager and chairman in senior football. They applied to join the Kent Invicta League for the 2015–16 season, and despite initially being turned down, were eventually accepted. They finished tenth in their first season, after which they were transferred to the Combined Counties League. In 2016–17 the club won the Division One Challenge Cup, beating Redhill in the final.

At the end of the 2017–18 season, the club were expelled from the Combined Counties League following a vote at a league EGM. However, the club started the 2018–19 season still in the league after the club appealed and whilst a FA investigation was carried out. When the investigation was concluded in November 2018, the club were removed from the league.

Season-by-season

Ground
During the 2015–16 season the club played at the 16,000-capacity Crystal Palace National Sports Centre, before moving to Banstead Athletic's Merland Rise ground for the 2016–17 season. They relocated to Whyteleafe's Church Road ground in 2017.

Honours
Combined Counties League
Division One Challenge Cup winners 2016–17

Records
Best FA Cup performance: Preliminary round, 2017–18
Best FA Vase performance: First round, 2016–17

References

Defunct football clubs in England
Association football clubs established in 2012
2012 establishments in England
Defunct football clubs in London
Kent Invicta Football League
Combined Counties Football League
Association football clubs disestablished in 2018
2018 disestablishments in England